Surfers Paradise may refer to:

 Surfers Paradise, Queensland, a beach resort town on the Gold Coast in Queensland, Australia
 Electoral district of Surfers Paradise, district in the Legislative Assembly of Queensland, Australian
 Surfers Paradise Street Circuit, a temporary street circuit 
 Surfers Paradise (horse), who won the 1991 Cox Plate in Australia
 Surfers Paradise (album), 2013 studio album by Cody Simpson

de:Surfers Paradise